Joe Neil James (April 12, 1934 – October 9, 2015) was an American football coach.  He was the 11th head football coach at Howard Payne University in Brownwood, Texas, serving for four seasons, from 1964 to 1967, and compiling a record of 16–24–1.  James came to Howard Payne from La Vega High School in Bellmead, Texas, where was head football coach from 1960 to 1963. James played college football at Howard Payne and was selected in the 20th round of the 1955 NFL Draft by the Chicago Bears.

Head coaching record

College

References

External links
 

1934 births
2015 deaths
American football tackles
Howard Payne Yellow Jackets football coaches
Howard Payne Yellow Jackets football players
High school football coaches in Texas
People from Spur, Texas
Coaches of American football from Texas
Players of American football from Texas